Brochard is a French surname. Notable people with the surname include:

Jean Brochard (1893–1972), French actor
Laurent Brochard (born 1968), French cyclist
Martine Brochard (born 1946), French actress and writer
Olivier Brochard (born 1967), French footballer and manager
Victor Brochard (1848–1907), French philosopher

French-language surnames